A rubefacient is a substance for topical application that produces redness of the skin, e.g. by causing dilation of the capillaries and an increase in blood circulation. They have sometimes been used to relieve acute or chronic pain, but there is limited evidence as to their efficacy, and as of 2014 the best evidence does not support using gels and creams containing rubefacients for this purpose.

Examples
Common medicinal rubefacients include:
Salicylates, such as methyl salicylate (oil of wintergreen)
Nicotinate esters
Capsaicin, derived from chili pepper, Capsicum minimum, "incites irritation without rubefaction"
Isopropanol (rubbing alcohol)
Menthol
Minoxidil
Thurfyl nicotinate (Trafuril)
Common herbal rubefacients include:
Cloves (Syzygium aromaticum)
Garlic (Allium sativum)
Ginger (Zingiber officinale)
Horseradish (Cochlearia armoracia)
Mustard (Brassica alba or Brassica nigra)
Nettle (Urtica dioica)
Rosemary oil (Rosmarinus officinalis)
Rue (Ruta graveolens)
Peppermint (Mentha piperita)

See also 
 Liniment

References 

Alternative medicine
Dermatologic drugs